Xu Ya (born 20 January 1998) is a Chinese badminton player. In 2016, she won the Asia Junior Championships in the girls' doubles event partnered with Du Yue. She also won the silver medal at the World Junior Championships in the girls' doubles event with Du. In 2017, she won the China International Challengge tournament in the women's doubles event partnered with Du and became the runner-up in the mixed doubles event with Tan Qiang.

Achievements

BWF World Junior Championships 
Girls' doubles

Asian Junior Championships 
Girls' doubles

BWF International Challenge/Series 
Women's doubles

Mixed doubles

  BWF International Challenge tournament
  BWF International Series tournament

References

External links 
 

1998 births
Living people
Chinese female badminton players
Badminton players from Hubei